The 1946 Catawba Indians football team was an American football team that represented Catawba College as a member of the North State Conference during the 1946 college football season. In its 13th season under head coach Gordon Kirkland, the team compiled a 10–2 record, defeated Maryville in the 1947 Tangerine Bowl, shut out 5 of 12 opponents, and outscored opponents by a total of 282 to 67.

Anthony Georgiana led the team in scoring with 66 points on 11 touchdowns.

Schedule

References

Catawba
Catawba Indians football seasons
Citrus Bowl champion seasons
Catawba Indians football